Igbo cuisine is the various foods of the Igbo people of southeastern Nigeria. 

The core of Igbo food is its soups.  The popular soups are Ofe Oha, Onugbu, ofe akwụ, Egwusi and Nsala (White pepper soup). Yam is a staple food for the Igbos and is eaten boiled or pounded with soups.

Igbo foods
Abacha
Echicha
Egusi
Akpu
Garri
Isi ewu
Moin moin
Ogbono soup
Okra soup
Palm wine
Yam (vegetable)
Ofe Oha
Fio Fio
Ukwa

References